The Fugitive is a 1914 Russian-French short film directed by Alexandre Volkoff.

Plot 

The film is based on a poem by Mikhail Lermontov.

Part 1. There are folk festivals in the village. Russian troops are approaching. Harun goes to war. During the battle, Harun's father and two brothers are killed, and he flees the battlefield out of fear.

Part 2 (not preserved). Harun wanders, returns to the aul, tries to justify himself to his relatives and dies.

Starring 
 Asho Shakhatuni
 Alesandr Rusteikis

References

External links 
 

1914 films
1910s Russian-language films
French silent short films
Russian silent short films
French black-and-white films
Russian black-and-white films
Films of the Russian Empire